The 1984 NCAA Division III men's basketball tournament was the tenth annual single-elimination tournament to determine the national champions of National Collegiate Athletic Association (NCAA) men's Division III collegiate basketball in the United States.

Held during March 1984, the field included 32 teams and the final championship rounds were contested at Calvin College in Grand Rapids, Michigan.

Wisconsin–Whitewater defeated Clark (MA), 103–86, to claim their first NCAA Division III national title.

Tournament bracket

Regional No. 1

Regional No. 2

Regional No. 3

Regional No. 4

Regional No. 5

Regional No. 6

Regional No. 7

Regional No. 8

National Quarterfinals

See also
1984 NCAA Division I men's basketball tournament
1984 NCAA Division II men's basketball tournament
1984 NCAA Division III women's basketball tournament
1984 NAIA men's basketball tournament

References

NCAA Division III men's basketball tournament
NCAA Men's Division III Basketball
Ncaa Tournament
NCAA Division III basketball tournament